Caracappa is an Italian family name, shared by:

 Matt Caracappa, owner of X-Entertainment.com and dinosaurdracula.com
 Stephen Caracappa, New York police officer convicted of working for the mafia
 Phil Caracappa, American MMA fighter